The Citoyen class consisted of four 74-gun ships of the line  all built at Brest Naval Dockyard to a design by Joseph-Louis Ollivier. The first ship (Citoyen, originally to have been named Cimeterre) was newly built there from 1761 to 1764, and the other three were rebuilt to her design from earlier ships.

 Citoyen
Built at: Brest
Keel laid: July 1761
Launched: 27 August 1764
Completed: December 1764
Fate: decommissioned in 1783 and taken to pieces in 1792

 Conquérant
Originally built at: Toulon
Ordered: 5 March 1743
Originally launched: 9 March 1746
Rebuilt: from January 1765 at Brest to the draught of the Citoyen, re-launched 29 November 1765 and completed in December 1765
Fate: Condemned in May 1796 but put back into service in March 1798, captured by the British on 2 August 1798 at the Battle of the Nile, broken up in Plymouth in January 1803

 Palmier
Originally built at: Brest
Keel laid: November 1750
Originally launched 21 July 1752
Rebuilt: from 23 May 1766 at Brest to the draught of the Citoyen, re-launched in December 1766 and completed in the same month
Fate: Rebuilt again at Brest in 1776. Abandoned and foundered off Bermuda in the Atlantic Ocean on 24 October 1782

 Actif
Originally built at: Brest (as a 64-gun ship)
Keel laid: 1750
Originally launched: 15 December 1752
Rebuilt at: from April 1767 at Brest to the draught of the Citoyen, re-launched on 5 October 1767 and completed in April 1768
Fate: Rebuilt again at Brest in 1774. Condemned in August 1783, sold 1784

Sources and references

Winfield, Rif and Roberts, Stephen S., French Warships in the Age of Sail 1626-1786: Design, Construction, Careers and Fates. (Seaforth Publishing, 2017) .

 
74-gun ship of the line classes
Ship of the line classes from France
Ship classes of the French Navy